Gladiator is a fictional character appearing in American comic books published by Marvel Comics. He first appeared in The X-Men #107 (Oct. 1977) and was created by writer Chris Claremont and artist Dave Cockrum. Gladiator, whose given name is Kallark, is a Strontian, and like others of his race has the capacity for great strength and various superpowers, but can only use them when he is completely devoted to a purpose; his abilities increase and decrease in accordance with his level of confidence. He was born on Strontia, which is part of the Shi'ar Empire and he is the leader of their Imperial Guard. He was also a member of the Annihilators, Dark Guardians, and Guardians of the Galaxy.

Publication history
Gladiator and the Imperial Guard were created by writer Chris Claremont and artist Dave Cockrum as an homage to DC Comics' Legion of Super-Heroes, with all the Imperial Guard's original members created as analogs of Legionnaires. Gladiator was the analog to Superboy; the name "Gladiator" was a conscious homage to the Philip Wylie novel Gladiator (1930) on which Superman was partially based. Gladiator's name, Kallark, is a combination of Superman's Kryptonian and human names: Kal-El and Clark Kent.

The character first appeared in The Uncanny X-Men #107 (Oct. 1977). Since then, he has been periodically featured in X-titles, Fantastic Four, Rom the Spaceknight, Silver Surfer, Nova, and New Warriors. His origin was revealed in War of Kings: Warriors #1 (2009).

He has played important roles in some of Marvel's major storylines, such as Operation: Galactic Storm (1992), Maximum Security (2001), and War of Kings (2009). During the Heroes Reborn era (1997), he starred in the three-issue Imperial Guard miniseries.

Following the conclusion of The Thanos Imperative, Gladiator has appeared as a member of the titular team in Annihilators #1-4 (March–June 2011) and Annihilators: Earthfall #1-4 (Sept.-Dec. 2011).

Fictional character biography

Kallark is a member of the Strontian race, and was born under Shi'ar rule. All Strontians are born with the capacity for great strength and various superpowers, but can only use them when they are completely devoted to a purpose. Fearing a Strontian rebellion, the Shi'ar emperor ordered Kallark, among other Strontians, to kill the Strontian elders. Only Kallark was devoted enough to carry out the order, and the others were killed when their wavering commitment rendered them weak. As a reward for his actions, Kallark was named the Praetor (leader) of the Shi'ar Imperial Guard.

When the X-Men come into conflict with the Shi'ar empire regarding the Phoenix entity, Gladiator battles them first at the command of Emperor D'Ken, and then at the behest of his successor, Empress Lilandra Neramani. He later aids the X-Men against several renegade Imperial Guardsmen serving a Shi'ar traitor named Lord Samedar.

While pursuing a band of shape-changing Skrulls, Gladiator arrives on Earth and mistakenly attacks the Fantastic Four. With the aid of Spider-Man and Captain America, the real Skrulls are exposed and captured. Meanwhile, Lilandra's sister Deathbird stages a coup and becomes the new Shi'ar Empress.

After an alternate universe version of Gladiator has a bout with Thor, the Earth-616 Kallark has an encounter with a rogue alien.

Deathbird commands him to lead the Imperial Guard against the space pirate Starjammers and superhero team Excalibur, but orders a retreat after learning the rebels are led by Lilandra.

Gladiator briefly comes into conflict with the X-Men again when he is mentally controlled by a Warskrull posing as Professor X. He then encounters several members of the Avengers during the Kree-Shi'ar War.

Along with Beta Ray Bill, Ganymede, Jack of Hearts, Silver Surfer and Terrax the Tamer, Gladiator is captured  by Tyrant with the intention of harnessing their power as a weapon for universal domination. Tyrant is defeated after the intervention of his creator, Galactus.

When many of Earth's heroes vanish after defeating Onslaught, Lilandra (who has resumed control of the Shi'ar) orders Gladiator and many of the Imperial Guard to help protect Earth. He later aids the X-Men again during an encounter with Galactus He is present when Galactus dies.

After thwarting an assassination attempt on Lilandra, Gladiator plays a role in temporarily turning Earth into an intergalactic prison.

Gladiator battles Thor at the request of Zarrko, but is defeated. He later came looking for the X-Men to help him fight against the Phalanx; however, his aggressive arrival led him to blows with the X-Men's Cannonball, and while he was defeated by the young mutant, he managed to get the help of several X-Men in stopping the invasion. Some time later, on Lilandra's orders, Gladiator returns to Earth and attacks the X-Men's home, but later learns that Lilandra was possessed by Cassandra Nova and frees her.

Liladra sends Gladiator to infiltrate the Kyln, an intergalactic prison, as a prisoner. He investigates rumors of a prisoner with the aid of Thanos and Star-Lord. The prisoner turns out to be an amnesiac Beyonder. Guided by the cosmic entity Living Tribunal, Gladiator fights the Champion of the Universe in an attempt to liberate the population of a planet the Champion had enslaved.

At the request of Lilandra, Gladiator returns to Earth on a mission to capture the Uni-Power and bring it back for evaluation. After an encounter with the Invisible Woman of the Fantastic Four, Gladiator invites the Uni-Power to return to the Shi'ar Empire as their guest. Although the Uni-Power agrees, it is captured en route by Krosakis, an energy leeching warlord who forces the Uni-Power into his body to become Captain Universe. Gladiator attempts to stop Krosakis but fails, with the warlord finally beaten by the Silver Surfer.

Gladiator is then commanded to stop the conqueror Vulcan, who is determined to destroy the Shi'ar empire as revenge against former emperor D'Ken for murdering Vulcan's mother.  Gladiator captures and delivers Vulcan to a Shi'ar prison facility.

A Shi'ar agent, however, wishing a return to the days of D'Ken's rule, frees Vulcan and together with Deathbird the pair stage a coup and usurp Lilandra. Vulcan escapes with the aid of some rebellious Shi'ar and leads a successful coup against Lilandra, becoming the next Shi'ar Emperor. Gladiator does not like Vulcan, but is honor-bound to serve him.

Vulcan consolidates his rule over the Shi'ar  - with Gladiator reluctantly assisting - as their forces destroy a race of ancient enemies, the Scy'ar Tal, and capture the rebel Starjammers. Vulcan begins to expand the empire, leading to a war with the Kree. When ordered to kill Lilandra, Gladiator abandons his post to protect her. During an attempt to return her to the throne, she is assassinated.

Vulcan is killed during a battle with the leader of the Kree, Black Bolt. With no one in line to inherit the throne, civil war threatens the Shi'ar empire. Gladiator accepts an offer to be Emperor to avoid further conflict.

Following the war with the cancerverse, Gladiator joins the Annihilators. With them, he protects Galador from the Dire Wraiths and opposes the Universal Church of Truth's attempt to revive the Magus.

Gladiator's son, Kubark, also known as Kid Gladiator, is sent to Earth with bodyguard Warbird (Ava'Dara Naganandini) as a punishment and is enrolled in the Jean Grey School For Higher Learning to train and learn more about his powers.

During the Avengers vs. X-Men storyline, Gladiator attempts to contact Kubark's bodyguard Warbird about the Phoenix Force's return to Earth. Gladiator orders them to leave the planet, but the close proximity of the Phoenix prevents the message from reaching Warbird. He then orders the preparation of his ship so he could go rescue his son and sends Death Commandos to kill the Phoenix's host. He is overwhelmed by the combined Phoenix Force Five and forced to recuperate at the X-Mansion.

During the Infinity storyline, Gladiator appeared as a member of the Galactic Council. Kubark participates in the Infinity incidents, sneaking into battle against his father's wishes. Kubark's performance in battle so impresses Gladiator he allows his son to return to his desired schooling back in the X-Mansion.

In the aftermath of the "Infinity Wars" storyline, Gladiator and the Shi'ar Empire arrive to save everyone after they were ejected from a hole in the space station following the Black Order stealing Thanos' body during the funeral. Gladiator joins up with Starfox's Dark Guardians. The Dark Guardians found Nova and ambush him, wounding him enough to crash land onto a planet. When Gladiator and Cosmic Ghost Rider order Wraith to back off, Nova takes the chance to fly off again. The Dark Guardians plan to track down again.

Powers and abilities
Gladiator possesses a number of superhuman capabilities as a result of his unique alien physiology including superhuman strength (capable of shattering a planet, ripping apart a black hole, and holding off the Destroyer armor), superhuman speed, stamina and durability (capable of withstanding the heat emitted from the Phoenix Force, a blast comparable to the full power of Odin, direct attacks from Thor and Mjolnir, point blank planetary explosions, and an explosion equivalent to a supernova), reflexes, microscopic and telescopic vision, X-ray vision,<ref>New X-Men #125 (June. 2002)</ref> heat vision (stated as "hotter than a star"); super-breath, "frost breath", super-hearing (capable of hearing sounds from light years away in space), a regenerative healing factor, psionic resistance (capable of withstanding mental attacks from telepaths to a certain degree), and warp speed flight (measured as "a hundred times the speed of light", and shown moving across galaxies before Heimdall could blink). Gladiator's abilities increase and decrease in accordance with his level of confidence and he is vulnerable to a certain form of rare radiation. Gladiator also has advanced longevity, having survived for centuries with very little aging.

Reception
 In 2018, CBR.com ranked Gladiator 5th in their "Age Of Apocalypse: The 30 Strongest Characters In Marvel's Coolest Alternate World" list.

Other versions
Marvel Zombies 2
In the alternate universe title Marvel Zombies 2, the character appears with other extraterrestrial beings "recruited" by the Galacti (the original infected heroes empowered by devouring the entity Galactus). He is killed while trying to eat the humans under the protection of the Black Panther and Forge.

Last Planet Standing
In the alternate universe title Last Planet Standing, the character appears with the Imperial Guard but fails to stop Dominas the Wavemaster and Galactus from destroying the Shi'ar homeworld.

Star Trek/X-Men
He physically battles the USS Enterprise itself during the Star Trek/X-Men crossover.

In other media
Television
 Gladiator appears in the animated television series X-Men. His first appearance is in the episode "Mojovision", but only as one of Mojo's robots programmed to look like Gladiator. The real Gladiator first appears in the episode "Phoenix Saga (Part 3): The Cry of the Banshee."

Video games
 Gladiator appears as a boss in Marvel: Ultimate Alliance, voiced by Dave Wittenberg. He is among the Imperial Guard that works for Deathbird after she overthrew Lilandra. Unlike the other Imperial Guard, Gladiator admits that he does not enjoy serving Deathbird, but is honor-bound to serve whoever holds the throne. Gladiator can only be defeated by activating equipment around the battle area, thus weakening his invulnerability and giving the player the chance to hurt him. He has special dialogue with Iceman and Sabretooth (whom he mistakes for Wolverine).

 Gladiator is also a playable character in the mobile game Marvel: Future Fight''.

References

External links
 Gladiator at Marvel Wiki
 Gladiator  at Uncannyxmen.net

Comics characters introduced in 1977
Characters created by Chris Claremont
Characters created by Dave Cockrum
Fictional characters with superhuman durability or invulnerability
Guardians of the Galaxy characters
Marvel Comics aliens
Marvel Comics characters who can move at superhuman speeds
Marvel Comics characters with superhuman strength
Marvel Comics superheroes